Thelosia meldola is a moth in the Apatelodidae family. It was described by William Schaus in 1900. It is found in Brazil (Parana).

References

Natural History Museum Lepidoptera generic names catalog

Apatelodidae
Moths described in 1900
Moths of South America